Agle Janam Mohe Bitiya Hi Kijo (In the next birth make me a daughter) is an Indian television series. It premiered on 16 March 2009 on Zee TV. It starred Ratan Rajput, Abhishek Rawat, Sudesh Berry, Mukul Harish, Richa Mukherjee, Dipika Kakar, Aditya Lakhia, Roopa Ganguly and Sukirti Kandpal. The show was produced by Siddharth Kumar Tewary of Swastik Pictures.

Plot
Laali, a very poor teenaged girl, lives in a small village in the Indian state of Bihar with her parents, two younger sisters, and a brother. They belong to the Musahar caste and live at the bottom of the social hierarchy. They go through many trials and tribulations. Laali and her father have to support the family with little or no money. Laali was married as a child and had not yet had her gauna (the ritual in which a married woman leaves her parents and goes to live with her husband). A strong-man named Balli goes around her village, offering money in return for poor girls. He tries to buy Laali and eventually succeeds. He sells her to a rich zamindar, Thakur Loha Singh. Laali's parents lie to her that she is being sent to her husband through a gauna ceremony.

Loha Singh intends to give Laali to a businessman in exchange for a business deal, which, however, falls through. Therefore, Laali is kept by Loha Singh. He wants to use her for getting a grandson to carry on his family name. Both his sons are married, but the elder one, Ranvijay, has only daughters while the younger, Shekhar's wife is unable to bear children. Loha orders Shekhar to get intimate with Laali in order to produce a male heir. Shekhar, in love with his wife Siddhi, opposes the idea but starts to respect and care for Lali after meeting and talking to Laali. He tells her to stop waiting for her husband Ganesiya, who will never come. From the beginning, Laali likes Shekhar but feels sad for Siddheshwari, his wife. Siddeshwari tells Shekhar that she wants him to get intimate with Laali for the sake of having an heir who will be their son. Shekhar tells this to Laali and they get close. At that same time Shekhar, encouraged by his mother, fights his father's ill-treatment of Laali, whom he sometimes keeps tied in the cowshed, and other poor villagers, especially women.

In the meantime, Loha Singh decides to relegate Siddheswari to the outhouse where Laali is kept and gives Laali Siddheswari's chamber to live in to keep her comfortable during pregnancy. This move is opposed by all the members of the family, including his wife Sumitra, Ranvijay's wife Nandini a.k.a. Buxarwalli, and Shekhar. Enraged at this insult of his wife, Shekhar plans the theft of the jewels on the body of Lord Shiva in the mansion's puja room to raise the money to take Siddheswari away from his father's house, which he finds oppressive. He manages to take her out of the house but fails to take the jewels which fall on the ground outside the house. Laali, to save Shekhar, takes the blame for the theft. Siddheswari is dismayed by Shekhar's decision to run away with no money in his pocket and forces him to return home. There he finds his brother trying to mutilate Laali's fingers on charges of the theft against his mother's instructions. All this happens when Loha Singh is away on a thirthayatra.

In the meantime, Loha Singh and Sumitra Devi's daughter, Ratna arrives with her aunt (bua) to her parental home for a vacation. Ratna takes an instant dislike for Laali, sensing her control over her brother, Shekhar, to whom she is extremely close. She wants to join a college for higher studies but is prevented from doing so, by her aunt and father, who start looking for a groom for her. He soon finds one — the son of a state-level minister, who is a criminal and childhood friend of Shekhar's. At first Ratna, attracted by his parents' wealth and prestige, wants to marry him, but on the day of the wedding realises the mistake she had made. A fight ensues in which Mukul, to whom Ratna is engaged, brandishes a knife at Ratna. Her mother, Sumitra, by mistake shoots Mukul and Ratna, killing them. Laali, who is witness to the scene, once again takes the blame and is arrested. Shekhar at first believes the charges against her but later realizes that she had taken the blame to save his mother. She is jailed and is presumed dead in a car accident. Eventually, Shekhar saves her, but continues to dislike her, hurt by her complicity in his sister's death.

Then, Sumitra disappears, having been kidnapped by Gangiya (the household maid, who is also Loha Singh's mistress), Siddeshwari, and Ranvijay because she had heard them talking about Siddheswari giving a gun to Ratna. One day at a mandir, Nandini is shocked to see Laali; she tells Laali about Sumitra and takes her to her in-laws' mansion as a servant. Laali attempts to find Sumitra. Gangiya, Siddeshwari, and Ranvijay go in to kill Sumitra, who is now hidden in a storeroom, but find that she has left. Laali then shows herself to Shekhar, who is shocked and tries to throw her out. She swears by her unborn child that she is only here to find Sumitra. Shekhar is shocked to know that Laali is pregnant and decides to help her by forcing Siddeshwari out of the house.

Soon Laali has her son. Ranvijay and Gangiya plan to kill the baby but fail. Laali wants to breastfeed her son, but Loha Singh refuses to allow that. In anger Laali threatens Loha Singh with a knife, to which he responds by threatening her with a gun; the situation is resolved when Loha Singh eventually gives his permission. Shekhar then invites Laali's family to live in the mansion because of a misunderstanding regarding the death of Laali's sister Rekha's husband. Rekha then meets Shekhar's cousin, Madhur, who falls in love with her, and they plan to marry. In the meantime, Gangiya plots to burn down the mansion, she instigates Jamuni and tells her to marry Ranvijay. Jamuni follows her mother's orders and she burns the mansion. She escapes while everyone else tries to get out. Laali and Loha Singh know that Gangiya is responsible. They find her and threaten her with a gun, but she throws chili powder in Loha's eyes and blinds him temporarily. Shekhar seeing Loha Singh with the gun in his hands wrongly thinks that he means to shoot Laali. He tries to shoot his father but accidentally shoots Laali. She falls down a cliff and is presumed dead. But she is actually alive. The next day, a funeral is held for Nandini, Siddhi, the younger of her twin daughters, and Laali.

Shekhar is mentally ill because of losing Laali. 
Although it is revealed that Seven years later, she is alive but has no memory of the past. she was rescued by some villagers and the doctor, who his wife dies but before she does she tells him to marry Laali because she is a good woman and had helped them a lot and saved his daughters many times, although he never does because he doesn't know of her past, Laali begins to think that the story of the patient the doctor told her has something to do with her and somehow finds the flute familiar, since then she begins to remember some corrupted bits of her past.

Time passes but in the end Laali after going to Loha's Mansion asks him to tell him the truth about her past if he knew it but he says that he knows nothing, but then she pushes him into telling her and he agrees and suggest to re-act what happened in order to make her remember and he does that

Loha Singh now wants to become the Sarpanch of the village, for which he lobbies the MLA of the constituency into which his village falls. The MLA is first skeptical of him, but Loha Singh promises muscle power to the MLA, who comes to his house for dinner and demands either Laali and Jamuni in return for the post of Sarpanch. The girls go into hiding and Loha Singh sends out Ranvijay to find them. Laali hides Jamuni inside the mansion. Loha Singh forces Gangiya to tell him where Laali is. She confesses and Sumitra attempts to stop Loha from getting her. Loha slaps Sumitra, who had strayed into her husband's den of criminals, and supposedly kills her. Actually, she isn't killed, kept alive by Gangiya, and continues to harass him as a ghost, even as he campaigns for the Sarpanchship. She even influences a local policeman to help Laali and Shekhar file Laali's candidacy for the post of Sarpanch. Eventually, Sumitra comes out of her hiding, forcing her husband to confess to all his crimes. He is sent to jail by the present Sarpanch, an elderly man of the village, and Laali is elected as the Sarpanch unopposed. Loha however is now helped by the MLA who brings him out of jail, and asks him to deal with Laali. He returns to his home and instigates the villagers against her, causing a rift between Laali and her sister Rekha. But the rift does not last long since Siddheswari's sister, Surabhi Singh, the only surviving member of her family, which had been burnt in a fire, comes to Loha Singh's house in the guise of a doctor who had been injecting Laali with syringes that makes her mentally insane and thinking that she's Siddheswari, conspires to set the house on fire once again. The house is set on fire, killing Surabhi, and no one else. Suman who had been behaving oddly with Laali comes to her senses, and agrees to return to her father's home, leaving Madhur to marry Rekha finally.

In the middle of all this Laali again gets pregnant. A dance party comes to their house to celebrate the occasion. In that dance party is Riddhi, Ranvijay's long-lost elder daughter, who was removed from the mansion when Ranvijay and Jamuni took it over. At first, Loha Singh and Ranvijay, not knowing who she is, try to shoo her away with some money. But she refuses to go. Laali finds out about her from an orphanage where she had been staying in earlier and rescues her with the help of Shekhar from a local goon called Kallu Bajrangi. In the ensuing fight Loha Singh, who had earlier shown her the door even after knowing who she was, is finally overcome by emotion and shoots Kallu Bajrangi, who had in a show of power burnt down Loha's anaj.

The show ends with Laali and Shekhar and their two children sitting in front of a tree with "Shekhar-Laali" curved into its bark!

Cast

Main 
 Ratan Rajput as Lekha "Laali" Prasad Singh: Nanku and Majri's daughter, Rekha and Munna's sister, Ganesia's former wife, Shekhar's wife (2009–2011)
 Abhishek Rawat as Shekhar Singh: Sumitra and Loha's son, Ranvijay's brother, Siddhi's former husband, Laali's husband (2009–2011)

Recurring
 Sudesh Berry as Thakur Loha Singh: Ayodhya's son, Mazboot's brother, Sumitra's husband, Madhur's uncle, Ranvijay and Shekhar's father (2009–2011)
 Mukul Harish as Madhur Singh: Mazbut's son, Rekha's lover (2010–2011)
 Richa Mukherjee / Dipika Kakar as Rekha Prasad: Nanku and Majri's daughter, Laali and Munna's sister, Madhur's lover (2009-2011)
 Sukirti Kandpal as Siddheshwari "Siddhi" Singh: Shekhar's first wife (2009–2010)
Aditya Lakhia as Narayan "Nanku" Prasad: Majri's husband; Laali, Rekha and Munna's father
Tuhina Vohra / Nupur Alankar as Manjiri "Majri" Prasad: Nanku's wife; Laali, Rekha and Munna's mother
 Sushmita Mukherjee as Gangia Suryavanshi: Loha's mistress, Jamuni's mother
 Vindhya Tiwari as Jamuni Suryavanshi: Gangia's daughter
 Manav Gohil as Dr. Shailendra Kumar
 Fatima Sana Shaikh as Suman
 Roopa Ganguly as Sumitra Singh: Loha's wife, Ranvijay and Shekhar's mother
Karmveer Choudhary as Sarpanch 
 Karan Veer Mehra as Ganesia Sardesai: Laali's former husband (2009)
 Sachal Tyagi as Ranvijay Singh: Loha and Sumitra's son, Shekhar's brother, Nandini's husband
 Surbhi Tiwari as Nandini Singh: Ranvijay's wife
 Deepak Jethi as Doman Singh
 Shakti Arora as Mukul
 Charu Asopa as Surabhi
 Ankita Sharma as Ratna
 Achyut Potdar as Ayodhaya Singh, father of Loha Singh
 Kannan Arunachalam as Kallu Bajrangi

Broadcast
 Arabic dubbed version was broadcast on Zee Alwan in 2013 under the name (لالي Arabic for Laali), and was split into two seasons, Laali 1 and Laali 2. some scenes from the episodes were missing or cut out. it ended on 23 March 2013.
 The show was dubbed in English and aired on Zee World on DStv 
 The show was broadcast on BTV and is currently rebroadcast on Bhojpuri Channell in Mauritius in its original version
 The show is dubbed in French on Antenne Reunion in Reunion Island as Laali.

Awards
BIG Television Awards 2011
 Khatarnak Character Male (Fiction) - Sudesh Berry as Loha Singh

Zee Rishtey Awards 2009
 Favourite Bhai - Ranvijay
 Favourite Saas-Bahu - Sumitra & Laali
 Favourite Parivaar - Loha Singh Parivaar
 Popular Female Face Of The Year - Laali

2009 9th Indian Telly Awards
 Popular Actor Negative Male - Loha Singh
 Popular Actor Female - Laali
 Best TV Lyricist - Yogesh Vikrant
 Best Title Singer for a TV Show - Richa Sharma

2009 Kalakaar Awards
 Best Actor (Female) - Ratan Rajput as Laali

2011 Global Indian Film & TV Honours
 Best Director - Rajesh Ram Singh

2009 ITA Awards
 Best Serial (Drama) - Agle Janam Mohe Bitiya Hi Kijo
 Best Actress - Ratan Rajpoot as Laali
 Best Actor In A Negative Role (Male) - Sudesh Berry as Loha Singh
 Best Actor In A Supporting Role - Adithya Lakhia
 Best Music Composer - Dony Hazarika for Shekhar Laali Love Theme

2010 ITA Awards
 Best Director - Rajesh Ram Singh

References

Zee TV original programming
Indian television soap operas
2009 Indian television series debuts
2011 Indian television series endings
Television shows set in Bihar
Swastik Productions television series